The Istana Park is a park in Singapore, located in the Museum Planning Area within the Central Area, Singapore's central business district. The park is bounded by Orchard Road, Penang Road, Penang Lane and Buyong Road.

The park is a landmark situated in front of the Presidential Residence, the Istana. It has an area of 13,000 square metres. The Istana Park serves as a gateway to Singapore's Civic District Trail, which aims to educate visitors of the rich history of Singapore.

History
On 20 February 1992, Senior Parliamentary Secretary for National Development, Lee Yiok Seng, unveiled plans to turn the area in front of the Istana to a landscaped park to mark the entrance to the Civic District. Two proposals were considered but the chosen design consisted of a water feature and planting beds.

The park was designed by Ren Matsui Landscape Design and the Public Works Department provided architectural and engineering design.

The Istana Park was completed in late 1995 and officially opened on 6 September 1996 by National Development Minister Lim Hng Kiang.

On 7 October 2017, the Istana Heritage Gallery, located inside the park, was opened by President Tony Tan.

Architecture
The centerpiece of the park is the 26-metre-high stainless stell and concrete Festival Arch in a reflecting pool. The design of the arch was based on the gateposts and railings at the Istana's entrance. The arch is symbolic of the gateway to Orchard Road. The reflecting pool is about 40cm deep and one-third the size of an Olympic pool.

As part of the Urban Redevelopment Authority's Civic District Lighting Plan, the park is lighted daily from 7pm to 7am.

In popular culture
Istana Park was served as the place for a U-Turn in the 9th Leg of the sixteenth season of The Amazing Race.

See also
List of Parks in Singapore
National Parks Board

References

External links
 National Parks Board
Istana Park

Landmarks in Singapore
Parks in Singapore
Museum Planning Area